Testosterone (/Testosteroni) is a Greek film directed by Giorgos Panousopoulos. It released in 2004 and it stars Dimitris Liakopoulos, Natalia Dragoumi, Dimitra Matsouka and others. The film won the third best film award and the award of the best leading actor in the Greek State Film Awards. The film was shot in Naxos.

Plot
A young man during military service takes his leave and goes to a Greek island in order to borrow an old car by his grandmother. Due to a breakdown in the car, he remains in the island more time until it is repaired. During his accommodation in the island, he ascertains that he comes across only women. At the beginning, he likes this situation but gradually it turns into a nightmare.

Cast
Dimitris Liakopoulos
Natalia Dragoumi
Dimitra Matsouka
Ketty Papanika
Tatiana Papamoschou
Maria Zorba

Awards

References

External links

Greek comedy films
2004 films